Ion Burlacu (born 3 February 1995) is a Moldavian football defender who plays for Spartanii Selemet.

Club statistics
Total matches played in Moldavian First League: 33 matches - 1 goal

References

External links

Profile at FC Academia Chișinău

1995 births
Moldovan footballers
Living people
Association football defenders
FC Academia Chișinău players